Philodromus lunatus is a spider species found in Europe (Croatia, Greece) and Western Asia (Turkey).

See also 
 List of Philodromidae species

References

External links 

lunatus
Spiders described in 2004
Spiders of Europe
Spiders of Asia
Arthropods of Turkey